The 36th Chamber of Shaolin, also known as The Master Killer, Shaolin Master Killer and Shao Lin San Shi Liu Fang, is a 1978 Hong Kong kung fu film directed by Lau Kar-leung and produced by Shaw Brothers, starring Gordon Liu. The film follows a highly fictionalized version of San Te, a legendary Shaolin martial arts disciple who trained under the general Chi Shan.

The 36th Chamber of Shaolin is widely considered to be one of the greatest kung fu films and a turning point in its director's and star's careers. It was followed by Return to the 36th Chamber, which was more comedic in presentation and featured Gordon Liu as the new main character with another actor in the smaller role of San Te, and Disciples of the 36th Chamber.

Plot 
A young student named Liu Yude is drawn by his activist teacher into the local rebellion against the Manchu government. The government officials, headed by the brutal General Tien Ta, however, quickly discover and suppress the uprising, liquidating the school and killing the students' friends and family members. Yude decides to seek vengeance and liberation for the people, and heads for the Shaolin temple to learn kung fu.

Wounded by Manchu henchmen during an escape, Yude reaches the temple and seeks sanctuary. Initially the monks reject him, since he is an outsider, but the chief abbot has mercy on the young man and lets him stay. One year later, Yude - now known as San Te - begins his martial arts training in the temple's 35 chambers, in each of which the temple's novices are trained in one aspect of the kung fu fighting arts.

The chambers shown in San Te's training are as follows (names of the chambers, if given, are from the subtitles and in quotation marks):
 "Top Chamber": This is considered the highest-level chamber, where the monks are reciting the Buddhist sutras from memory. When the head master of the chamber tells San Te to leave due to his ignorance of the sutras, San Te protests, only for the head master to knock him down from a distance. San Te flees the chamber, and agrees to start at the lowest level.
 "35th Chamber": This chamber teaches lightness and balance. Monks in training must jump on a bundle of sticks floating in a pool of water to reach the dining hall. Falling in the water requires the monk to dry his clothes off before entering the dining hall (by which time the food is all gone).
 Third Chamber: This chamber trains arm strength. Monks must carry water in buckets with blades attached to their arms to keep the arms held straight out. The chamber also serves as the monastery's laundry.
 Fourth Chamber: This chamber trains wrist strength. Monks must strike a gong with a weighted pole to the rhythm of the head master's striking his wooden fish.
 Fifth Chamber: This chamber trains eyesight. Monks must follow a light without turning their heads, or risk getting burned by large sticks of incense.
 Sixth Chamber: This chamber trains head strength. Monks must headbutt their way through a corridor of sandbags and then place incense sticks on an altar. This is the last conditioning chamber; after passing this chamber, San Te is allowed to learn kung fu techniques.
 Seventh Chamber: This is the chamber for training empty-hand forms and techniques.
 "Leg Chamber": This chamber trains kicking techniques.
 "Sword Chamber": This chamber trains broadsword techniques.
 Ninth Chamber: This chamber trains staff techniques.

San Te advances more rapidly than any previous student, reaching the rank of deputy overseer within the space of six years. Challenged by the monastery's Discipline Chief, who thinks him unfit for his role, San Te has several exhibition matches with him, only to be beaten each time. However, after inventing the three section staff, San Te finally prevails and gains the chief abbot's permission to become overseer of one of the chambers.

When San Te professes that he wants to create a new chamber where he can train ordinary people in the basics of kung fu so they can defend themselves against their oppressors, the temple officially banishes him in a surreptitious way to allow him to carry out his mission. He returns to the outside world, namely to his hometown, and assists the people, gathering several young men who loyally follow him and become his first students. Before the political revolution where his aspirations reach completion, he is forced into conflict with Tien Ta. A fierce duel ensues, where San Te is victorious. Finally, he returns to the Shaolin temple, where he establishes the 36th chamber, a special martial arts class for laypeople to learn kung fu.

Cast
 Liu Yude/Monk San Te - portrayed by Gordon Liu
 General Tien Ta - portrayed by Lo Lieh
 Rice Miller Six - portrayed by Wong Yue
 Hung Hsi-Kuan - portrayed by Yu Yang 
 Lu Ah-Tsai - portrayed by Hsu Shao-Chiang
 Tung Chien-Ching - portrayed by Wu Hang-Sheng
 Abbot of Justice Office - portrayed by Lee Hoi-sang

Production

Release 
The film was released on VHS as early as 1993. It was released on DVD in February 2000 by Crash Cinema Media under the title Shaolin Master Killer. In 2007, it was released on DVD by Dragon Dynasty as The 36th Chamber of Shaolin. It was released on Blu-ray on 2 March 2010 from Vivendi Visual Entertainment.  The film aired on the El Rey Network in 2016.

Reception 
36th Chamber of Shaolin has received massive universal acclaim and is widely considered to be one of the greatest kung fu films ever made and a highly influential entry in the genre.

According to the Harvard Film Archive, the film is an "exhilarating rendition of the legendary dissemination of the Shaolin martial arts" and an "absorbing account of [an] initiation into the vaunted Shaolin style, ... depicted here [as] an inner voyage of discovery".

In 2014, Time Out polled several film critics, directors, actors and stunt actors to list their top action films. The 36th Chamber of Shaolin was listed in 22nd place on this list.

In 2021, Complex posted the article '24 Best Kung Fu Movies of All Time' and The 36th Chamber of Shaolin was listed in 5th place on this list.

Influences
The Wu-Tang Clan's debut album Enter the Wu-Tang (36 Chambers) got the latter part of its name from the film. In addition, Wu-Tang Clan member Masta Killa takes his name from one of the film's alternate titles.

References

External links 
 
 
 

1978 films
1978 martial arts films
Hong Kong action films
Shaw Brothers Studio films
1978 action films
Kung fu films
Hong Kong martial arts films
1970s Mandarin-language films
Films directed by Lau Kar-leung
Films set in 18th-century Qing dynasty
Shaolin Temple in film
1970s Hong Kong films